Robert Sidney Halligan Jr. (born January 3, 1953) is an American singer, musician, music producer and songwriter who has collaborated with many artists, particularly in the hard rock/heavy metal genre, throughout his career. He is currently the lead vocalist and guitarist for the band Ceili Rain, a group he founded that combines Celtic, rock, and contemporary Christian music.

As a songwriter, Halligan has contributed songs to two albums by the heavy metal band Judas Priest: "(Take These) Chains" from 1982's Screaming for Vengeance and the single "Some Heads Are Gonna Roll" from 1984's Defenders of the Faith. Judas Priest lead singer Rob Halford included another song by Halligan, "Twist", on the album Resurrection by his band Halford.

Halligan worked with Rick Cua focusing on Cua's solo career (f.i. album You're My Road) as also extensively with the hard rock/heavy metal band Kix, beginning in the mid-1980s, when he co-wrote most of the songs on the band's third album, Midnite Dynamite. Incidentally, one of the most successful songs he has ever written is Kix's near-top ten hits, "Don't Close Your Eyes" (co-written with one-time Crack the Sky frontman John Palumbo and Kix bassist Donnie Purnell), which was featured on the band's follow-up album, Blow My Fuse. The song remains Kix's highest-charting single.

He also wrote the songs "Beat 'Em Up" and "Make Rock Not War" on Blue Öyster Cult's Club Ninja record, "Rise to It" and "Read My Body" on Kiss' album Hot in the Shade, "Could've Been You" on Cher's album Love Hurts and the single "Rock You" for Helix's Walkin' the Razor's Edge album. In addition, Halligan wrote or co-wrote most of the songs on Night of the Crime by the 80s heavy metal band Icon. He also co-wrote the song "Bang Down the Door" on Bonfire's 1989's Point Blank record.

Solo discography
Window in the Wall (1991)
Sprung (1994)

References

External links
Ceili Rain

Musicians from New York (state)
Living people
1953 births
Place of birth missing (living people)